In Israeli politics, the national camp or right-wing bloc is an informal coalition of nationalist and right-wing, religious conservative political parties that since 1977 has frequently co-operated to form governments.

The coalition is led by Likud, and includes parties to its political right as well as religious parties. Generally, the two ultra-Orthodox parties (Shas and the United Torah Judaism alliance) align with Likud. In the past, the coalition has included the National Religious Party, the National Union, Gesher, Tkuma, The Jewish Home, the New Right, Yisrael Beiteinu (until late 2019) and Zehut.

Right-wing bloc

Following the September 2019 Israeli legislative election, Israeli Prime Minister Benjamin Netanyahu formed a "right-wing bloc" for the purposes of coalition negotiations, consisting of Likud, Shas, United Torah Judaism and Yamina, that would support Netanyahu as Prime Minister. In February 2021, Yamina left the bloc to pursue negotiations with opposition parties, and the Religious Zionist Party, which had split from Yamina, also declined to sign on, despite supporting Netanyahu as Prime Minister. However, the Religious Zionist Party later rejoined the bloc and participated in bloc meetings.

Following the fall of the Netanyahu government in June 2021, the four parties of the right-wing bloc went into the opposition, but continued to hold regular joint meetings in Netanyahu's office.

The bloc returned to power under Netanyahu's leadership following the 2022 Israeli legislative election, forming the thirty-seventh government of Israel.

Composition

Current

Right-wing parties not in the bloc

In January 2022, Israeli Prime Minister Naftali Bennett suggested he was planning to form a "new national camp" with Yamina, Yisrael Beiteinu and New Hope, excluding Likud. The three parties parted their ways during the collapse of 36th Cabinet of Israel.

The national camp in the Knesset

References

Conservatism in Israel
Political party alliances in Israel
Political terminology